Beekeeping in Ukraine is a major economic activity. Approximately 700,000 people, 1.5% of the Ukrainian population, are engaged in the production of honey. Ukraine is ranked as the number one country in Europe and among the top five countries in the world for honey production, producing  annually. Ukraine produces the greatest quantity of honey per capita in the world.

The 2013 World Beekeeping Congress was held in October 2013 in Kyiv, Ukraine.

History 
Petro Prokopovych (1775–1850) was the founder of commercial beekeeping. He introduced novelties in traditional beekeeping that allowed for great advancement in the field. Among his most important inventions was a hive frame in a separate honey chamber of his beehive. He also invented a crude queen excluder between brood and honey chambers.

According to the Association Agreement with the EU, a quota of duty-free supplies of honey from Ukraine to the EU has been set.

World honey production is 1.5 million tons per year, and Ukraine's share is 5%. According to the FAO, since 2008, Ukraine has been ranked first in honey production among European countries (with a gross harvest of up to 75 thousand tons) and fourth after such world leaders as China (367 thousand tons), Turkey (81.4 thousand tons) and Argentina (81 thousand tons). In total, there are about 700 thousand people engaged in bee breeding and honey production — one and a half percent of the country's population.  

In the year to date, as of January 10, Ukraine fills the quota allocated for 2020 of duty-free supplies of honey to the countries of the European Union. In 2020, Ukrainians competently filled the quota as of January 10 (it took only ten days).

In culture 

The Ukraine National Beekeeping Museum located in Kyiv is one of the world's largest beekeeping museums. It contains displays about beekeeping history, hive types, smoker display, art, and other areas of beekeeping. The grounds include a library and laboratory for beekeeping.

See also
 Economy of Ukraine

References

External links

 A video-presentation about beekeeping in Ukraine by the Brotherhood of Ukrainian Beekeepers

 
Agriculture in Ukraine
Economy of Ukraine